The personal standard of Adolf Hitler ( or Standarte des Führers) was a square red banner of arms with a black swastika on a white disc inside a central wreath of golden oak leaves and four Nazi eagles in the corners. It typically indicated the presence of Adolf Hitler at official events and was displayed in the form of a hoisted flag, small car flag, and so on.

Hitler introduced the standard after assuming supreme command of the Wehrmacht, following the forced resignation of Werner von Blomberg, Minister of War and Commander-in-Chief of the Wehrmacht, in 1938. 

The personal standards of Hitler were manufactured in various sizes. Some were not flown but were hung or displayed in interior venues like the opera or at Nazi Party Day. The standard was also embossed on teaspoons from the mess hall dining sets of Führerbegleitbrigade. 
The standard was similar to the banner of the 1st SS Panzer Division Leibstandarte SS Adolf Hitler (LSSAH), which had minor differences. After Soviet troops captured one LSSAH banner staff in 1945, the trophy has been confused with Hitler's personal standard at the 1945 Moscow Victory Parade.

Displays

References

Adolf Hitler
Flags of Nazi Germany
Personal flags
Standards (flags)